Righteous armies, sometimes called irregular armies or militias, are informal civilian militias that have appeared several times in Korean history, when the national armies were in need of assistance.

The first righteous armies emerged during the Khitan invasions of Korea and the Mongol invasions of Korea. They subsequently rose up during the Japanese invasions of Korea (1592–1598), the first and second Manchu invasions, and during the Japanese occupation and preceding events.

During the long period of Japanese intervention and annexation from 1890 to 1945, the disbanded imperial guard, and Confucian scholars, as well as farmers, formed over 60 successive righteous armies to fight for Korean freedom on the Korean peninsula. These were preceded by the Donghak movement, and succeeded by various Korean independence movements in the 1920s and beyond, which declared Korean independence from Japanese occupation.

During the Japanese invasions under Hideyoshi of Korea
The righteous armies were an irregular military that fought the Japanese army that twice invaded Korea during the Japanese invasions of Korea (1592–1598). Righteous armies were most active in the Jeolla Province in the southwestern area of Korea. Righteous armies included peasants, scholars, former government officials, and Buddhist warrior monks as well. Righteous armies were important during the war because a significant portion of the expected government organized resistance had been destroyed in Gyeongsang and Chungcheong Provinces in the south by the force of Japanese arms at the outset.  The natural defenders had been stripped away and the residue had been called north to help protect the fleeing king.  Moreover, many of the district officers had obtained their commissions not through merit, but by bribery or influence, and were essentially incompetent or cowards.  This was highlighted in their performance and in the performance of their units in the early days of the conflict.
This kind of resistance was totally unexpected by the Japanese invaders. In Japanese warfare, when the leaders fall, civilians would simply submit. However, upon learning that the Korean people were forming organized resistance against them, the Japanese were shocked. Japanese strategies were based on the premise that the people of Korea would submit to them and assist their supply line by giving their food. However, this was not the case and righteous armies continued to interrupt the Japanese supply line. People's voluntary resistance movements were one of the major reasons why Japanese invasion was not successful.

In Gyeongsang province
 Hapcheon (June 6, 1592): Kim Myeon and Jeong In-hong against Mōri Terumoto
 Chogye (June 7, 1592): Son In-gap against Mōri Terumoto
 Ucheokhyeon (July 10, 1592): Kim Myeon and Kim Seong-il against Kobayakawa Takakage
 Yeongcheon (July 27, 1592): Gwon Ung-su and Park Jin against Fukushima Masanori
 Uiryeong: Gwak Jae-u against Kobayakawa Takakage
 Hyeonpung: Gwak Jae-u against Hashiba Hidekatsu
 Yeongsan: Gwak Jae-u against Hashiba Hidekatsu

In Jeolla province
 Damyang (June 25, 1592) : Go Gyeong-myeong and Yang Dae-park
 Naju : Kim Cheon-il
 Gwangju : Kim Deok-nyeong

In Chungcheong province
 Geumsan (July 9, 1592) : Go Gyeong-myeong and Gwak Yong against Kobayakawa Takakage
 Okcheon : Jo Heon
 Geumsan : Yeonggyu and Jo Heon
 Cheongju : Yeonggyu and Jo Heon

In Gangwon province

In Hwanghae province
 Yeonan : Yi Jeong-am

In Pyeongan province
 Mountain Myohyang : Seosan

In Hamgyeong province
 Gilju : Jeong Mun-bu

During the Japanese colonial period (1910–1945)

Late Joseon dynasty period Korean nationalism outgrew the unplanned, spontaneous, and disorganized Donghak movement, and became more violent as Japanese colonizers began a brutal regime throughout the Korean peninsula and pursued repressive policies against the Korean people.

The Japanese colonial authorities fought with rifles, state-of-the-art cannons, machine guns, repeaters, mounted cavalry reconnaissance units in the mountains, and an entrenched class of informers and criminals developed over the previous decade before the battles began.

Koreans fought with antique muzzle-loaders, staves, iron bars, and their hands. There were rare instances of modern weapons, and a few enemy weapons captured.

For at least thirteen years after 1905, small irregular forces, often led by regular army commanders, fought skirmishes and battles throughout Korea against Japanese police, armies, and underworld mercenaries who functioned to support Japanese corporations in Korea, and as well-armed Japanese settlers who seized Korean farms and land. In one period, according to Japanese records in Boto Tobatsu-shi (Annals of the Subjugation of the Insurgent), between October 1907 and April 1908, over 1,908 attacks were made by the Korean people against the invaders.

While most attacks were done using available weapons, and bare hands, international arms dealers profited. Arms dealers and governments who supplied the Korean resistance included Chinese arms dealers from across the Yalu and in coastal waters; German arms dealers provided Mausers, and a French cruiser in September 1908, resupplied Korean Catholic armies in payment for gold at exorbitant prices. Smugglers from Japan as well supplied Murada weapons, with links to anti-Meiji forces who hoped to see Ito and his clan toppled in the wake of disasters in the Japanese economy.

After the Russian revolution, some weaponry was diverted from the White forces into what is now North Korea, and supporters built there, however this was sparse and while white Russian mercenaries fought against the Japanese, this was a minor element.

During the Righteous Armies Wars
The Righteous Army was formed by Yu In-seok and other Confucian scholars during the Peasant Wars. Its ranks swelled after the Queen's murder by the Japanese Samurais. Under the leadership of Min Jeong-sik, Choe Ik-hyeon and Shin Dol-seok, the Righteous Army attacked the Japanese army, Japanese merchants and pro-Japanese bureaucrats in the provinces of Gangwon, Chungcheong, Jeolla and Gyeongsang.

Choe Ik-hyeon was captured by the Japanese and taken to Tsushima Island where he went on hunger strike and finally died in 1906. Shin Dol-seok, an uneducated peasant commanded over 3,000 troops. Among the troops were former government soldiers, poor peasants, fishermen, tiger hunters, miners, merchants, and laborers.

The Korean army was disbanded on August 1, 1907. The Army was led by 1st Battalion Commander Major Park Seung-hwan, who later committed suicide, occurred after the disbandment, led by former soldiers of the Korean Army against Japan in Namdaemun Gate. The disbanded army joined the Righteous Armies and together they solidified a foundation for the Righteous Armies battle.

In 1907, the Righteous Army under the command of Yi In-yeong massed 10,000 troops to liberate Seoul and defeat the Japanese. The Army came within 12 km of Seoul but could not withstand the Japanese counter-offensive. The Righteous Army was no match for two infantry divisions of 20,000 Japanese soldiers backed by warships moored near Incheon.

The Righteous Army retreated from Seoul and the war went on for two more years. Over 17,000 Righteous Army soldiers were killed and more than 37,000 were wounded in combat. Unable to fight the Japanese army head-on, the Righteous Army split into small bands of partisans to carry on the War of Liberation in China, Siberia, and the Baekdu Mountains in Korea. The Japanese troops first quashed the Peasant Army and then disbanded the remained of the government army. Many of the surviving guerrilla and anti-Japanese government troops fled to Manchuria and Primorsky Krai to carry on their fight. In 1910, Japan annexed Korea and starting the period of Japanese rule.

Armies and orders of battle
Of the sixty righteous armies, the list and descriptions below follow what is known of the names of the more well-known armies and their sequential appearance in combat; individual generals and named figures are given larger biographies on separate articles which cite more historical background.

In 1895: Righteous army of Eulmi 
Yi So-ung
No Eung-gyu
Gi U-man
Yi Gang-nyeon

In 1905: Righteous army of Eulsa 
Choe Ik-hyeon
Min Jong-sik
Shin Dol-seok
Jeong Yong-gi
Yi Han-gu
Im Byeong-chan

In 1907: Righteous army of Jeongmi 
Hong Beom-do
Yun Hui-sun
Cha Doseon
Kim Su-min
Min Geung-ho

13 province alliance righteous army in 1908
Commander in chief: Yi In-yeong
Commander: Heo Wi
Representative of Gangwon: Min Geung-ho
Representative of Chungcheong: Yi Gang-nyeon
Representative of Gyeongsang: Park Jeong-bin
Representative of Gyeonggi, Hwanghae: Gwon Jung-hui
Representative of Pyeongan: Bang In-gwan
Representative of North Hamgyeong: Jeong Bong-jun
Representative of Jeolla: Mun Tae-su

See also
History of Korea
Namdaemun Battle
Korean independence movement
Korean Liberation Army
Battle of Qingshanli

References
 William E. Henthorn, A History of Korea, Free Press: 1971

Military history of Korea
Joseon dynasty
Korea under Japanese rule
Militias in Asia